The Coupe de Guadeloupe is the top knockout tournament of the Guadeloupe football.

Finals
The list of cup finals: 
1941/42 : Racing Club   4–2 Redoutable 
1943 : not finished
1944/45 :   not played
1946 : La Gauloise  1–0 CS Moulien
1947 : Cygne Noir    3–2 Red Star
1948 : CS Moulien  2–0 Cygne Noir 
1949 : not played
1949/50 : Red Star  2–1 CS Moulien 
1951 : Racing Club   3–2 La Gauloise
1952 : Racing Club   2–1 La Gauloise
1953 : not played
1954 : CS Moulien  3–2 Juventus SA
1955 : Juventus SA  3–2 Cygne Noir 
1956 : Red Star  2–1 CS Moulien 
1957 : CS Capesterre 2–1 CS Moulien  
1958 : Juventus SA  2–1 Red Star
1959 : Racing Club   2–1 Red Star
1959/60 : Red Star  3–2 Juventus SA 
1961 : Redoutable    3–2 Juventa
1962 : CS Capesterre 3–2 Juventus SA 
1963 : Solidarité Scolaire  4–2 CS Moulien 
1964 : Juventa   2–1 CS Capesterre
1965/67 : ''not held
1968 : Juventa   1–0 Cygne Noir
1969 : Juventa   and La Gauloise (abandoned at 1–0)
1969/70 : S.Port-Louis  3–0 L'Etoile de Morne-à-l'Eau
1970/71 : Juventus SA  2–1 Red Star 
1972 : CS Moulien  2–1 Equinoxe
1973 : Solidarité Scolaire  awd La Gauloise (not played)
1974 : CS Moulien  2–1 Racing Club 
1975 : Juventus SA  3–0 La Gauloise
1976 : Juventus SA  3–2 L'Etoile de Morne-à-l'Eau
1977 : L'Etoile de Morne-à-l'Eau    3–1 Racing Club 
1978 : Juventus SA  3–1 L'Etoile de Morne-à-l'Eau
1979 : L'Etoile de Morne-à-l'Eau    5–1 Stade Lamentinois
1979/80 : JSC Mgte  1–0 CS Moulien 
1981 : Jeunesse (T.R.) : 5–2 CS Capesterre
1982 : CS Capesterre 5–0 Siroco
1983 : Cygne Noir    1–1 L'Etoile de Morne-à-l'Eau (aet, 4–2 pens)
1984 : L'Etoile de Morne-à-l'Eau    1–0 Cygne Noir
1985 : L'Etoile de Morne-à-l'Eau    2–0 S.Port-Louis 
1986 : Solidarité Scolaire  1–0 Sporting
1987 : Siroco    1–0 L'Etoile de Morne-à-l'Eau
1988 : US Baie-Mahault
1989 : Zénith
1991 : Racing Club
1992 : Solidarité Scolaire
1993 : Solidarité Scolaire
1994 : Arsenal
1999 : AJCS Terre-de-Haut   1–0 Juventus SA
2000 : AS Gosier 3–3 Juventus SA (aet, 4–1 pens)
2001 : Racing Club   2–2 Jeunesse (T.R.)  (aet, 4–3 pens)
2002 : L'Etoile de Morne-à-l'Eau    2–1 Solidarité Scolaire
2003 :
2004 : Racing Club   3–1 AS Gosier
2005 : Rapid Club    3–1 Fumerolles
2006 : Amical Club  3–2 Solidarité Scolaire (aet)
2007 : La Gauloise            2–0 AS Dragon (Gosier)
2008 : CS Moulien 1–0 US Baie-Mahault
2009 : Racing Club  1–0 Amical Club     (aet)   
2010 : CS Moulien 2–0 JS Vieux-Habitants
2011 : Red Star 1–0 Racing Club
2012 : USR 1–0 JS Vieux-Habitants
2013 : CS Moulien 2–0 Solidarité Scolaire
2014 : CS Moulien 3–2 L'Etoile de Morne-à-l'Eau
2015 : L'Etoile de Morne-à-l'Eau 2–0 Cactus
2016 : USC de Bananier 1–1 USR (aet, 5–4 pens)
2017 : CS Moulien 1–0 US Baie-Mahault
2018 : L'Etoile de Morne-à-l'Eau 1–0 Phare du Canal
2019 : US Baie-Mahault 4-1 CS Saint-François

References

Football competitions in Guadeloupe
Guadeloupe
Guad